Stacy Earl is the debut album by the American dance/pop singer Stacy Earl, released on the RCA Records label in 1992. "Love Me All Up" and "Romeo & Juliet" were released as singles; both reached the Billboard Top 40.

Production
Siedah Garrett and Glen Ballard worked on Stacy Earl. Earl chose the album's songs from a pool of around 500. The Wild Pair performed on "Romeo & Juliet".

Critical reception

The Indianapolis Star wrote that "the best and most sonically original tracks are the disco-tinged 'Love Me All Up' ... and the melodic 'Do You Really Want My Love'." The Chicago Tribune noted that "synthesized dance tracks and sugary lyrics sung at a breathy high-pitch abound."

Track listing

References 

1992 debut albums
RCA Records albums